Schadrack Niyonkuru (sometimes spelled Shadrack) is a member of the Pan-African Parliament and the National Assembly of Burundi.  He is the former President of the Parti du peuple, a Burundi political party allied with the Front for Democracy in Burundi.  Niyonkuru is from Bururi Province.

Works

References

Year of birth missing (living people)
Living people
Members of the Pan-African Parliament from Burundi
Front for Democracy in Burundi politicians